Ang Tatlong Hambog or Tatlong Hambog (also known as The Arrogant Three or Three Beggars) is a 1926 Filipino silent romantic comedy film which was produced by Jose Nepomuceno during the pre-war era of Philippine cinema. It is a romantic comedy starring Isabel Rosario (Elizabeth) "Dimples" Cooper, a vaudeville actress, and Luis Tuason, a race car sportsman. The film was considered controversial because it was the first in the history of Philippine movies to show a lips-to-lips kiss onscreen.

Cast
Luis Tuason
Dimples Cooper

References

External links
 

This article incorporates text under the GNU Free Documentation License from en.wikipilipinas.org

1926 films
Philippine silent films
Philippine romantic comedy films
1926 romantic comedy films
Philippine black-and-white films
Silent romantic comedy films